Androsace laevigata, synonym Douglasia laevigata, known as the cliff dwarf primrose, is a species of flowering plant in the primrose family, Primulaceae. It is native to the central Pacific coastal mountains of North America (west of the crest of the Cascade Range of British Columbia, Oregon and Washington) below  elevation. Its habitat includes cliffs, rocks, and alpine.

Description
The five-lobed flowers are deep pink to rose. Each lobe is  mm long.

Taxonomy
Androsace laevigata was first described by Asa Gray in 1880 as Douglasia laevigata. Molecular phylogenetic studies showed that the genus Douglasia is nested within Androsace, and the transfer to Androsace by Wendelbo in 1961 is now accepted.

References

External links

laevigata
Plants described in 1880
Flora of British Columbia
Flora of Oregon
Flora of Washington (state)
Flora without expected TNC conservation status